Fenghua railway station is a railway station on the Ningbo–Taizhou–Wenzhou railway located in Fenghua District, Ningbo, Zhejiang, China.

Railway stations in Zhejiang